The Crooked Creek Formation is a geologic formation in Kansas. It preserves fossils.

See also

 List of fossiliferous stratigraphic units in Kansas
 Paleontology in Kansas

References
 

Geologic formations of Kansas
Landforms of Meade County, Kansas